North Weald Airfield  is an operational general aviation aerodrome, in the civil parish of North Weald Bassett in Epping Forest, Essex, England. It was an important fighter station during the Battle of Britain, when it was known as the RAF Station RAF North Weald. It is the home of North Weald Airfield Museum. It is home to many private aircraft and historic types, Essex & Herts Air Ambulance helicopter and is an active flight training airfield.

History 

Royal Flying Corps Station North Weald Bassett aerodrome was established in the summer of 1916 during the First World War by the Royal Flying Corps. Later it became Royal Air Force with effect from Monday 1 April 1918. Its military functions continued to develop during the interwar period, with the building of large hangars and accommodation for Royal Air Force (RAF) personnel. The airfield played an important part in the air defence strategy of the United Kingdom during the Second World War. Initially Hawker Hurricanes were deployed at the airfield, alongside Bristol Blenheim night fighters. The Hurricanes from North Weald saw action over the beaches of Dunkirk and played a key role in the Battle of Britain. In 1940, two American Eagle Squadrons moved into North Weald supplied with Supermarine Spitfires. A couple of years later, Norwegian squadrons were reassigned to the airfield.

Following the war jet fighter squadrons were based at North Weald. The sight of Gloster Meteors and de Havilland Vampire fighters in the west Essex skies was commonplace from 1949. In the late 1940s and until the mid-60s an Air Training Corps gliding school, latterly No 614 VGS, also operated at North Weald on weekends, teaching cadets up to certificate B. Later the Essex Gliding Club was formed at North Weald and operated for many years until local airspace congestion forced a move to Ridgewell in North Essex.

The Control Tower was built in 1952 as part of the early Cold War modernisation efforts. A Grade II listed building, it remains one of only seven control towers of this type to be built and considered to be one of the best surviving examples.

The last front line combat unit, No. 111 Squadron RAF flying Hawker Hunters, the famous Black Arrows of 22 loop formation fame, left North Weald in 1958. In 1964 the RAF withdrew from the airfield completely.
The first Royal International Air Tattoo was held at North Weald in 1971.
The airfield spent time in both British Army and Royal Navy hands for a short time until in 1979 North Weald became surplus to the Ministry of Defence (MoD) operational requirements and was sold to Epping Forest District Council.

An original 1927 hangar remains, as does the former Officers Mess, a Grade II listed building. Some former married quarters dating from the early 1970s (and now in private ownership) can be seen in Lancaster and York Roads. A Hawker Hurricane Mk1 replica has been erected near the main gate and can be viewed on market days.

Civilian use

North Weald is a general aviation airfield with over 40,000 movements per annum, connecting people from London and Essex, with destinations across England and abroad by air travel.

The airfield is home to a collection of vintage and veteran aircraft such as the Supermarine Spitfire, North American P-51 Mustang, Curtiss Kittyhawk, Douglas Dakota, Douglas Skyraider, Supermarine Seafire and North American Harvard.
The aircraft are kept airworthy and many are available for experience flights.
The resident operators include Hangar 11 Collection, Aero Legends, and Kennet Aviation.
It's also home to early ex-military jets such as the Hunter, Venom, Vampire, Gnat, Jet Provost. The Hawker Hunter, which crashed at the 2015 Shoreham Airshow was based at North Weald.

Pilot training, aircraft rental and pleasure flights on general aviation types such as Cessna 172 and Piper PA28 are offered by Academy Aviation, North Weald Flight Training and North Weald Flying Group.

On occasions North Weald has 300 to 500 movements a day.

The airfield was granted listed status in 2005.

Non-aviation uses 
The former crosswind runway and the southern side of the field are used to host community events, supercar driving experiences, as a filming and a specialist driving training location and has commercial, logistical and local businesses, with further industrial development currently planned.

There is a large Saturday market based on the airfield which draws huge crowds from around Essex and north London. It claims to be one of the largest open air markets in the UK. Bus service 522 operates a frequent service to the market from Harlow, and the service is subsidised by the company that owns the market.

The airfield was used as the transit camp for the 21st World Scout Jamboree.

In the 1990s, the Aces High hangar was used as the home for Channel 4's TV game show The Crystal Maze, which had moved from Shepperton Studios because of lack of space. A Lego City Stuntz commercial was filmed on the field.

An inland border facility has been opened on the airfield in January 2021 to help alleviate the impact of Brexit.

Maintenance organisations 
FBOs at North Weald provide aircraft maintenance and repair, handling and cleaning, refuelling and hangarage services, as well as visitor parking and events organising.

North Weald Flying Services or The Squadron, established in 1989, is a licensed general aviation aircraft maintenance company in accordance with EASA Part M Sub Part G, Part 145 and M5.
North Weald Flying Services was acquired by Aero Legends in 2019.

Weald Aviation is a licensed general aviation aircraft maintenance company offering A8-20 maintenance and E4-M5 design approvals, with specialist knowledge on various types of warbirds and ex-military aircraft.

North Weald Airfield Museum
The focus of the North Weald Airfield Museum is the people who worked at RAF North Weald in World War I and World War II, including both service personnel and civilians. Exhibits include photographs, personal memories, and artifacts about the airfield's history, including its role in the Battle of Britain, the American and Norwegian squadrons stationed there in World War II, and the Royal Air Force squadrons stationed there over the years. The museum is located in the former RAF North Weald Station Office, situated just outside the airfield's current perimeter. Visitors can examine military vehicles and historic aircraft.

North Weald Fire Rescue
North Weald Fire Rescue are a private independent fire and rescue service from Great Dunnow in Essex. Their vehicles are based and operated nationwide out of the airfield. Their fleet of vehicles and crews have been in attendance at events at the airfield since 1987.

RAF North Weald Memorial

The RAF North Weald Memorial is dedicated to all who served at North Weald. Located near the airfield's main gate, it was dedicated in 2000. The memorial includes an obelisk erected in 1952 by the people of Norway in commemoration of the Norwegian airmen stationed at the airfield in World War II.

Development controversy
The East of England Regional Assembly on its Draft Regional Spatial Strategy for the East of England examination in public exercise asked members of the public for comment on the possibility of the airfield location being used as the site for a development plan for 6,000 houses. It received over 6800 objections and followed on strong lobbying against the project by local residents.

Essex & Herts Air Ambulance 

Essex & Herts Air Ambulance launched its Hertfordshire service in 2008. Originally based at Hangar 7 on the airfield, it moved to a purpose-built base in 2021. From 2008 until 2017, the service operated an MD902 Explorer. From August 2017, Helimed 55 was upgraded to an AgustaWestland AW169 - a £5 million helicopter which the charity fully owns. Two rapid response vehicles are also based here.

The other aircraft operates from Earls Colne Airfield.

National Police Air Service
On 7 September 2017 it was provisionally agreed by Epping Forest District Council to allow the National Police Air Service to operate three helicopters and one fixed wing aircraft from North Weald Airfield with a 25-year lease. The facility serves as the main base for police aircraft in the London area and neighbouring counties, replacing the previous London base at Lippitts Hill. Kier Capital Projects commenced work near the airfield's western perimeter late in 2018, and flying operations commenced in the autumn of 2019.

Accidents and incidents
Three people were killed in a mid-air collision in 2000. The AAIB report  in part concluded that "The collision occurred because the pilots of both aircraft did not see the other aircraft in sufficient time to take effective avoiding action".

On Sunday, 9 May 2010, a light aircraft crashed into a car at the airfield  and burst into flames a few seconds after the collision. The two vehicle occupants were not injured and were able to pull the pilot free from the aircraft. The pilot had initiated a go-around after aborting the landing attempt due to turbulence, and had then lost full directional control of the aircraft. The report by the Air Accidents Investigation Branch noted that the accident occurred after the pilot attempted to avoid a collision with tall trees and a potential crash on top of parked aircraft, having by then only very limited control of the plane. However the cause was not wholly conclusive due to the extent of the impact and the subsequent fire damage and as such stated that "a pre-impact anomaly could not be entirely excluded".

Past residents
The following squadrons were here at some point:

Units;

References

Citations

Bibliography

External links

North Weald Airfield - official site
Official Facebook Page with recent photos, videos and announcements
Historical Photos of the control tower
North Weald Airfield History

Airports in Essex
Royal Air Force stations in Essex
Battle of Britain
Museums in Essex
Military aviation museums in England
World War II museums in the United Kingdom
Royal Air Force stations of World War II in the United Kingdom
North Weald Bassett